Eduard Pavlovich Koptily (born 9 July 1969) is a former Russian football player.

References

1969 births
Living people
Soviet footballers
FC FShM Torpedo Moscow players
FC Fakel Voronezh players
FC Asmaral Moscow players
Russian footballers
Russian Premier League players
FC Shinnik Yaroslavl players
FC Kristall Smolensk players
Association football defenders
FC Nosta Novotroitsk players